Charles Edward Chauvel OBE (7 October 1897 – 11 November 1959) was an Australian filmmaker, producer and screenwriter and nephew of Australian army General Sir Harry Chauvel. He is noted for writing and directing the films Forty Thousand Horsemen in 1940 and Jedda in 1955. His wife, Elsa Chauvel, was a frequent collaborator on his filmmaking projects.

Early life

Family
Charles Edward Chauvel was born on 7 October 1897 in Warwick, Queensland, the son of James Allan Chauvel and his wife Susan Isabella (née Barnes), pioneer farmers in the Mutdapilly area. He was the nephew of General Sir Harry Chauvel, Commander of the Australian Light Horse and later the Desert Mounted Corps in Palestine during World War I. His father, a grazier, at 53 also enlisted to serve in Palestine and Sinai in World War I. The Chauvels were descended from a French Huguenot family who fled France for England in 1685, and soon established a tradition of serving in the British army. The Australian Chauvels descended from a Charles Chauvel who retired from the Indian Army to New South Wales in 1839 and was a pioneer in the New England region.

Chauvel was educated at the Normanby State School (now the Mutdapilly State School), The Southport School and Ipswich Grammar School in Queensland.

Early Work in Film Industry
After leaving school, he worked on Queensland properties, and on his family property when his father was at war, before studying commercial art and taking drama classes in Sydney. He was fascinated by films and pestered a friend, showman Reginald "Snowy" Baker, to give him work as a production assistant; usually, he was the man in charge of the horses. Chauvel worked on The Shadow of Lightning Ridge (1920) and The Jackeroo of Coolabong (1920) with Baker; he also assisted on Robbery Under Arms (1920)

He designed the St Aidan's Church of England in Mutdapilly in 1921 (the church closed in 1974 and is now used as a private residence).

Hollywood
Chauvel followed Baker to Hollywood in 1922, at his own expense, and spent some time as a jack of all trades including working as an extra, a lighting technician, a publicist, a stunt double and so on. The films he worked on included Strangers of the Night (1923).

Director

Moth of Moonbi (1926) 
Back in Australia after about a year, Chauvel obtained finance from Queensland businessmen and friends to make his first film The Moth of Moonbi. It was a romantic melodramas exploring a theme of the decadent city vs the authentic country. The Moth of Moonbi is a country girl who flutters to the city lights, loses her fortune, but eventually returns home and finds love with her father's trusty stockman.

The film was profitable enough for Chauvel to raise funds for a second film.

Greenhide (1926)
In Greenhide a city girl struggles to cope on a cattle station and gradually finds love with her polar opposite, an extremely taciturn bushman. Like Moonbi the film was made in Harrisville near Brisbane, enlisting the locals as extras and using locations around his family property "Summerlands", near the edge of town. While making Greenhide he met Elsa May Wilcox (professional name Elsa Sylvaney), an actress, whom he married in 1927. After their marriage she traveled with him and assisted him on all his films.

Both these silent films were released in 1926 and were reasonably successful in Australia. Unfortunately Chauvel could not arrange for the release of his silent movies in Hollywood because of the transition to sound.

Chauvel returned to Australia and worked as a cinema manager during the Depression.

In the Wake of the Bounty (1933)
In 1933 he made his first talkie: In the Wake of the Bounty starring Errol Flynn as Fletcher Christian before Flynn went on to Hollywood. The film mixed re-enactments with documentary, and focused not so much on the mutiny itself as on its consequences. To provide a long postscript to the story of the mutiny, the Chauvels went to Pitcairn Island and shot interesting footage of the  descendants, spending three months on the island. He also included footage of bare-breasted Tahitian dancers which caused a temporary problem with the censors. The documentary parts were later edited out and used as promotional material for the 1935 Hollywood film about the mutiny.

Heritage (1935)
In 1935, Chauvel won a Commonwealth Government competition for Heritage which gave a panoramic view of Australian history. It begins with a character from the earliest days of white settlement (1788), following his struggles, his loves and his marriage, then skips to the modern generation, where a romance between descendants of the original characters completes a circle. The modern hero is struggling to run an outback cattle station, the modern heroine is an expert aviator.

Uncivilised (1936)
In 1936 he made Uncivilised, a "jungle story" filmed in Cape York, in Far North Queensland, Australia. Aimed at the U.S. market, it is the story of an upper class "girl-reporter" investigating the white leader of an Aboriginal tribe.

That year also saw the release of Rangle River (1936), based on a script by Charles and Elsa Chauvel.

Forty Thousand Horsemen (1940)
The outbreak of war meant that Chauvel turned to war-themed films, making Forty Thousand Horsemen (1940), a tribute to the Australian Light Horse Brigade in Palestine in World War I, in the Cronulla sand dunes. It was both a popular and critical success and was credited with boosting morale. It also launched the career of actor Chips Rafferty.

Chauvel then focused on making a series of propaganda shorts for the Australian war effort including Soldiers Without Uniform (1942).

Rats of Tobruk (1944)
Chauvel attempt to repeat his Horseman success with The Rats of Tobruk in 1944. It was not as successful.

Sons of Matthew (1949)
After the war he made a film about a pioneer family in Queensland, Sons of Matthew (1949), drawing on his own family history

Jedda (1955)
In 1955 Chauvel made perhaps his best known film, Jedda. Jedda is a story of an Aboriginal baby girl raised by a white station owner and kept in ignorance of traditional ways, and the Aboriginal man who carries her off, even though this is a forbidden "wrong way" marriage, and brings tragedy to both of them.

Both Jedda and Matthew involved travel to remote areas and difficult conditions for filming, and are considered Chauvel's best works. Jedda was the first Australian feature film made in colour, and had to be developed overseas as there were no colour processing facilities in Australia. For Jedda, the Chauvels sought out Aboriginal people for the lead roles, and in Robert Tudawali, playing the male lead, they found someone with great natural ability. Both these films were made in a period when the Australian film industry had virtually collapsed, unable to compete with imported films.

Final years and death
After this, Chauvel turned to television, making the BBC series Walkabout which travelled to interesting locations in Australia. He died unexpectedly of coronary vascular disease on 11 November 1959, less than a month after Errol Flynn, whom he cast in In the Wake of the Bounty. According to Ken G. Hall, Chauvel had left a message asking to speak to Hall on the day he died, and left an estate worth £32,000.

Legacy
In honour of the contribution made to filmmaking by Elsa and Charles Chauvel, the Chauvel Award was created in 1992 to celebrate those who have made an impact on the Australian film industry. It is awarded annually at the Gold Coast Film Festival.

Chauvel Cinema, an art-house cinema in the Sydney suburb of Paddington, is named after him.

Chauvel was posthumously inducted into the Queensland Business Leaders Hall of Fame in 2013.

In 2009 as part of the Q150 celebrations, Charles Chauvel was announced as one of the Q150 Icons of Queensland for his role as an "Influential Artists".

Filmography

Film

Television

Unmade projects
Chauvel announced a number of projects over the years that were not made, including:
Conflict – a project for which Chauvel registered scripts in 1930 and 1933
adaptation of the novel Geoffrey Hamlyn about early Australian pioneers
a script called The Man from Down Under which Chauvel registered in 1941
adaptation of the novel My Love Must Wait by Ernestine Hill about the life of Matthew Flinders – Chauvel claimed he paid a record price for an Australian novel to get the rights and gave a copy of the novel to Laurence Olivier during his 1948 tour of Australia in an attempt to interest him in playing Flinders
the life of boxer Les Darcy starring Tommy Burns
adaptation of the novel When Cobb and Co Was King by Will Lawson
adaptation of the novel Wards of the Outer March by Kathleen Glasson Taylor, a story of convict-bushranger days'
wartime documentary about the wool industry.

References

Further reading
 Susanne Chauvel Carlsson Charles and Elsie Chauvel Movie Pioneers Brisbane: University of Queensland Press, 1989. The basis for John Doggett-Williams's documentary film The Big Picture.
 Charles Chauvel Heritage Sydney: Angus and Robertson, 1935.
 Charles Chauvel In the wake of The Bounty from Tahiti to Pitcairn Island Sydney: Endeavour Press, 1933
 Charles and Elsa Chauvel Walkabout London: W H Allen, 1959.
 Elsa Chauvel My Life with Charles Chauvel (Sydney: 1973).
 Stuart Cunningham Featuring Australia: The cinema of Charles Chauvel North Sydney: Allen and Unwin, 1991.
 Elyne Mitchell Chauvel Country: the Story of a pioneering Australian family Melbourne: 1983.
 Neil McDonald Damien Parer's War Melbourne: Lothian Books 1991 (War photographer Damien Parer spent time as one of Chauvel's crew on Uncivilised and Forty Thousand Horsemen.)
 Eric Reade The Talkies Era: a pictorial history of Australian sound filmmaking 1930–1960 Melbourne: Landsdowne Press, 1972.
 Charles Chauvel at Australian screen

External links

Website and blog about Charles Chauvel by daughter Susanne Chauvel Carlsson
Still photos at the National Film and Sound Archive
Queensland Art Gallery information
Queensland Business Leaders Hall of Fame
Charles Chauvel OBE Digital Stories and Oral History, State Library of Queensland

Australian film directors
Silent film directors
Australian film producers
Australian screenwriters
People from Warwick, Queensland
1897 births
1959 deaths
20th-century Australian screenwriters